Qahan (also Romanized as Qāhān) is a village in Qahan Rural District, Tafresh District, Arak County, Markazi Province, Iran. At the 2006 census, its population was 715, in 193 families.

References 

Populated places in Qom Province